Bob Martin (January 18, 1942 - September 21, 2022) from Lowell, Massachusetts, was an American folk singer-songwriter.

Biography
While attending Suffolk University in Boston during the 1960s, he was influenced by the Cambridge folk scene and played at the Nameless Coffeehouse, Club 47 (now Club Passim), and other folk clubs. In 1972, he went to Nashville and recorded his first album, Midwest Farm Disaster. In 1974, he became disillusioned with music and moved to a farm in West Virginia with his family. In 1982, he recorded his second album, Last Chance Rider. He gave up music once again, this time for ten years, until the release of his third album in 1992. This album, The River Turns the Wheel, contained backing vocals by Bill Morrissey and Cormac McCarthy. Martin continued performing nationally afterward, opening for Merle Haggard in 1999.

Discography
 Midwest Farm Disaster (RCA Victor, 1972)
 Last Chance Rider (June Appal Recordings, 1982)
 The River Turns the Wheel (1997)
 Next to Nothin''' (2000)
 Live at The Bull Run'' (2010)

References

External links
 Official web site
 2011 interview with Bob Martin on Prog Sphere

American male singer-songwriters
RCA Records artists
American folk musicians
Singer-songwriters from Massachusetts
1942 births
Living people